This article lists the squads for the 2022 SheBelieves Cup, the 7th edition of the SheBelieves Cup. The cup consisted of a series of friendly games, and was held in the United States from 17 to 23 February 2022. The four national teams involved in the tournament registered a squad of 23 players. 

The age listed for each player is on 17 February 2022, the first day of the tournament. The numbers of caps and goals listed for each player do not include any matches played after the start of tournament. The club listed is the club for which the player last played a competitive match prior to the tournament. The nationality for each club reflects the national association (not the league) to which the club is affiliated. A flag is included for coaches that are of a different nationality than their own national team.

Squads

Czech Republic
Coach: Karel Rada

The 23-player squad was announced on 2 February 2022. On 15 February 2022, Lucie Jelínková was replaced by Kateřina Bužková.

Iceland
Coach: Þorsteinn Halldórsson

Iceland's 23-player squad was announced on 4 February 2022.

New Zealand
Coach:  Jitka Klimková

The 23-player squad was announced on 8 February 2022.

United States
Coach:  Vlatko Andonovski

The 23-player squad was announced on 3 February 2022. A few days later, Abby Dahlkemper withdrew from the squad due to a back injury, and was replaced by Trinity Rodman.

Player representation

By club
Clubs with 3 or more players represented are listed.

By club nationality

By club federation

By representatives of domestic league

References

2022